Anduin Llane Wrynn is a fictional character who appears in the Warcraft series of video games by Blizzard Entertainment. First appearing in the original launch of World of Warcraft in 2004, Anduin is the son of Tiffin and Varian Wrynn, and the king of the human kingdom of Stormwind. Following Varian's disappearance, young Anduin is crowned king of Stormwind. He succeeds his father following his death in World of Warcraft: Legion, as well as his position as leader of the Alliance. Anduin also appears as a playable character in the crossover multiplayer online battle arena game Heroes of the Storm. The character is voiced by Josh Keaton.

Critical reception to Anduin focused on his empathy as well as benevolent traits, which is often contrasted to his father's warrior impulses and hardline approach in dealing with the opposing Horde faction.

Development
Diegetically, Anduin Wrynn is named after Anduin Lothar, a  military leader and war hero of the Kingdom of Stormwind, and his grandfather, King Llane Wrynn of Stormwind. 

Josh Keaton found it "surreal" that he is the voice actor of an adult Anduin, as he used to be a dedicated Horde player. He described Anduin as a moral compass, who is a highly educated royal and possesses a "big-picture perspective, that is unique to the game particularly for such a young character". Keaton said he had to demonstrate "a certain regal bearing" for Anduin, given the character's heritage, that needs to come through in his voice.

Appearances
Anduin first appeared in World of Warcraft as a child and the Crown Prince of Stormwind. When his father King Varian Wrynn was abducted, he was named King of Stormwind but due to his young age, he was unable to rule, and the task of regency was given to Highlord Bolvar Fordragon, a venerated paladin of the Alliance. Once King Varian returned to reclaim his throne, the prince began to focus his efforts on spiritual matters and diplomacy, traveling throughout Azeroth to understand how he might heal lands and souls ravaged by war.

In World of Warcraft: Mists of Pandaria, with the land of Pandaria revealed to the world, the young prince personally leads a campaign to unveil the region's secrets and cool the flames of war that threatened to consume the continent. Anduin was one of the main opposition to the Horde's Warchief, Garrosh Hellscream, in his fight to save the continent and its people. Anduin eventually succeeds, however Garrosh was able to escape and initiate the events of World of Warcraft: Warlords of Draenor.

In the Legion expansion, Anduin permanently assumes the throne after Varian was killed by Gul'Dan's forces on the Broken Shore. Doubtful of his abilities to be a good king, Anduin travels to the Broken Shore where his father died and meets with Genn Greymane and Velen. Anduin finds his father's sword and expresses that he cannot be the hero, nor the king his father was. Genn consoles him and a vision of his father appears before him, telling him he must do "What a King must do." Anduin, now filled with a new sense of purpose and courage, takes up his father's sword and declares he is ready to lead his people against the Burning Legion. Anduin's preference for diplomacy and fostering understanding with others enabled him to form strong bonds with the Draenei Prophet Velen and even a few key members of the Horde. 

In the Battle for Azeroth expansion, Anduin Wrynn is approached by Wrathion, the son of the Black Dragon Aspect Deathwing, who offers advice and assistance for the conflict against the Old God N’Zoth.

Hearthstone
Anduin appears as the default player hero for the Priest class in Hearthstone.

Heroes of the Storm
Anduin is a playable character in Heroes of the Storm as a ranged healer, which is considered to be a unique class for players to master. "Holy Word: Salvation", one of his two "heroic" abilities, is a reference to the World of Warcraft: Battle for Azeroth cinematic trailer, in which Anduin heals his Alliance soldiers in an identical fashion.

Reception
As a major character in a video game franchise known for constant, total war between the various species of its universe, Anduin Wrynn has attracted commentary about his benevolent and pacifistic nature, which is the opposite of his father Varian Wrynn. Dawn Moore from Joystiq described Anduin as a physically attractive character who is "gentle, but tenacious", a patient character who is wise beyond his young age and has a similar force of will like his father Varian Wrynn. Anne Stickney compared and contrasted the actions and traits of both father and son in an article, concluding that while Varian is "a leader of strength and steel against the harsh winter of war", Anduin is "strong in his own right, ready and willing to pick up and mend any heartbreak yet to come". Mathew McCurley, also from Joystiq, said he liked Anduin's characterization in The Shattering, author Christie Golden's companion novel to World of Warcraft: Cataclysm. He noted that while Anduin retained his father's caution in his dealings with the Horde, he comes across as more "open-minded, forgiving, and willing to compromise on things above and beyond him", and said that he had the potential to be a strong, compassionate leader for the humans of Azeroth.

Cass Marshall from Polygon recounted Anduin's character arc in World of Warcraft and its expansions in a series of articles. In her criticism about Blizzard's handling of the in-universe political dynamics in the Warcraft universe, Marshall noted that in the promotional material released depicting the renewed hostilities between the Alliance and the Horde during the events of Battle for Azeroth, Anduin comes across as the presumable representation of "the good guy" faction as the Alliance's figurehead leader, but questioned his credibility and ability to run a kingdom and a multispecies coalition. Marshall drew attention to his youth, his close association with the allegedly racist werewolf King of Gilneas, and the fact that he assumes his current position because he is the scion of an absolutist hereditary monarchy as opposed to his merits as leader. Marshall found Anduin's plight in the Shadowslands expansion to be particularly tragic, and "a little funny". Mike Fahey from Kotaku opined that since the Warcraft universe's equivalent of the afterlife play a central role in  Shadowslands, Anduin's late father Varian Wrynn could be brought back so that Anduin "can fulfil his destiny to become the human version of Thrall. A human Jesus to his orc Jesus, as it were."

References

External links

 Anduin Wrynn at the official World of Warcraft website

Adoptee characters in video games
Fictional male royalty
Fictional swordfighters in video games
King characters in video games
Male characters in video games
Orphan characters in video games
Prince characters in video games
Religious worker characters in video games
Video game characters introduced in 2004
Nobility characters in video games
Warcraft characters